SCDC may refer to:

 South Cambridgeshire District Council
 South Carolina Department of Corrections
 St. Chux Derby Chix
 Swarthmore Coalition for the Digital Commons, now Students for Free Culture
 An abbreviation used in Scitron Digital Contents products